Lepidochrysops koaena is a butterfly in the family Lycaenidae. It is found in northern Tanzania.

References

Butterflies described in 1911
Lepidochrysops
Endemic fauna of Tanzania
Butterflies of Africa